The 2018 Rink Hockey European Championship, also named as EuroHockey 2018, was the 53rd edition of the Rink Hockey European Championship, a biennial tournament for men's national roller hockey teams of Europe organised by World Skate Europe - Rink Hockey, which took place between 14 and 22 July in A Coruña, Spain.

Spain won the tournament and took its seventeenth title overall.

Teams
Eleven teams joined the tournament. Andorra, Belgium and Netherlands joined the other eight teams from the previous edition.

This had the highest number of participants since 1994.

Venue
All the games of the tournament took place at Pazo dos Deportes de Riazor, in A Coruña, Spain.

Group stage

Group A

Group B

Classification group

Play-off stage

5th to 8th place

Final standings

References

External links
 Official website
 EuroHockey 2018 at CERS website

International roller hockey competitions hosted by Spain
2018 in Spanish sport
CERH European Roller Hockey Championship
2018 in roller hockey
July 2018 sports events in Spain